KZTC-LD, virtual and VHF digital channel 7, is an American low-powered AMGTV-affiliated television station licensed to San Diego, California, and owned by Civic Light, Inc.

KZTC-LD transmits from Mount Woodson, northeast of Poway, and serves mainly the northwest portion of coastal San Diego County. Its signal also reaches other parts of east San Diego County, albeit with some interference. When the station is on the air with its VHF signal on channel 7, it blocks Los Angeles' ABC-owned KABC-TV, which also has a digital signal on channel 7 that can be received when KZTC is off the air for whatever reason.  The station went from airing infomercials to rebroadcasting MundoFox (now defunct) from XHDTV-TDT's second digital subchannel (49.2), a MyNetworkTV affiliate, operated by Entravision Communications.

The station's schedule consists of nonstop paid programming. Owner Civic Light Television claims to have operated low power television operations in the San Diego area since 1990, when the FCC began to authorize television stations of that type. While KZTC's license goes back to 1990 when it operated on UHF channel 63 as "Bay 63" (with the call sign K63EN), it moved to analog VHF channel 7 in July 2010 in order to vacate the defunct channel 52-69 channel space in the FCC's revised UHF bandplan.

"Bay 63" originally operated from a small suite in a medical arts building at 2850 6th Avenue in the Hillcrest district of downtown San Diego, adjacent to Balboa Park. The station showed San Diego City Council proceedings and other public domain shows. It was an affiliate of the "Shop at Home" network (now ShopHQ) during the time it operated from downtown San Diego. Because the station operated from the top floor of the building, it was also known for broadcasting nightly the sun setting off San Diego Bay. The station attempted to gain commercial traction by being carried by the predominant San Diego cable TV operator, Cox Communications. But those attempts were unsuccessful despite petition drives and ads put in the local television listing magazine at the time published in the Sunday edition of the San Diego Union-Tribune.

External links
Official website

ZTC-LD
Television channels and stations established in 1993
Low-power television stations in the United States
1993 establishments in California